Pamankada is a suburb in Colombo, Sri Lanka. It is also part of the area numbered Colombo 6 and its postcode is 00600. The Colombo - Horana Road runs through the center of the town and connects to High Level Road and Havelock Road. Neighbouring suburbs are Kirulapana, Kohuwela, Dehiwela, Wellawatte and Bambalapitiya.

Tourist attractions
 Pamankada Balapokuna is an ancient pond located in the Balapokuna Raja Maha Vihara premises.

References

Populated places in Western Province, Sri Lanka